Class 17 may refer to:

British Rail Class 17, a British class of diesel locomotive
DRG Class 17, a German class of 4-6-0 tender locomotive
NSB El 17, a Norwegian class of electric locomotive

See also

 
 Class (disambiguation)
 C17 (disambiguation)
 17 (disambiguation)
 Type 17 (disambiguation)
 Model 17 (disambiguation)